Jessie Kahnweiler is an American actress, writer, comedian, film director and YouTube personality.

Kahnweiler is also known for such television series as The Skinny.

References

External links

Living people
21st-century American actresses
Jewish American screenwriters
American women film directors
American YouTubers
American women screenwriters
American television writers
American television directors
American feminists
21st-century American women writers
Year of birth missing (living people)
American women television writers
American women television directors
21st-century American comedians
21st-century American screenwriters
21st-century American Jews